Karyl McBride is an American author and psychotherapist.

Career 
McBride works as a psychotherapist. She specialized in treating daughters of narcissistic mothers for over 17 years before writing her self-help book Will I Ever Be Good Enough? Healing the Daughters of Narcissistic Mothers in 2008. McBride's second book, Will I Ever Be Free of You? How to Navigate a High-Conflict Divorce from a Narcissist and Heal Your Family, in 2015.

Books 

 Will I Ever Be Good Enough? Healing the Daughters of Narcissistic Mothers (2008)
 Will I Ever Be Free of You? How to Navigate a High-Conflict Divorce from a Narcissist and Heal Your Family (2015)

References 

American psychotherapists
21st-century American women writers
University of Wyoming alumni
University of Northern Colorado alumni
Union Institute & University alumni
Living people
Date of birth missing (living people)
Year of birth missing (living people)